George Heinrich Adolf Scheele (1808–1864) was a German botanist and 19th century explorer. 

He was an expert on spermatophytes 

Scheele was the first person to classify Cucurbita texana.

California
An important part of his botanical specimen collections are stored in the Herbarium of the California Academy of Sciences in San Francisco, California.

Author abbreviation

References 

19th-century German botanists
1808 births
1864 deaths
Botanists active in North America
People associated with the California Academy of Sciences